The Westport Observatory  is an astronomical observatory in Westport, Connecticut, operated by the Westport Astronomical Society and formerly known as the Rolnick Observatory.   The observatory is located at the highest elevation in the town.  It was built upon the former BR-73 Nike missile site in the mid-1960s and has undergone several upgrades and refurbishments since then.

See also 
List of astronomical observatories

References

External links
The Westport Observatory Clear Sky Clock

Astronomical observatories in Connecticut
Buildings and structures in Westport, Connecticut
Tourist attractions in Fairfield County, Connecticut